The Goethe Link Observatory, observatory code 760, is an astronomical observatory near Brooklyn, Indiana, United States. It is owned by Indiana University and operated by the Indiana Astronomical Society https://iasindy.org/about.html, which efforts are dedicated to the pursuit of amateur astronomy.

It is named in honor of amateur astronomer Dr. Goethe Link, an Indianapolis surgeon, who built it with his private funds. Construction of the observatory started in 1937, and the telescope was first operated in 1939. In 1948, he donated the observatory to Indiana University.

From 1949 until 1966, the Indiana Asteroid Program was conducted at Goethe Link, using a 10-inch Cooke triplet astrograph (f/6.5). The program resulted in the discovery of 119 asteroids, which were credited by the Minor Planet Center to "Indiana University".

When light pollution began to degrade the Goethe Link Observatory's capabilities in the 1960s, Indiana University built a new facility in the Morgan–Monroe State Forest officially designated as the Morgan–Monroe Station (MMS) of the Goethe Link Observatories. IU operated that facility through about 2014. Today, Indiana University primarily uses the WIYN 3.5-m and 0.9-m telescopes located at the Kitt Peak National Observatory near Tucson, AZ for ongoing research.

The naming of the two main-belt asteroids, 1602 Indiana and 1728 Goethe Link – both discovered at Goethe Link Observatory in 1950 and 1964, respectively – is related to the Observatory and its parent institution.

See also 
 List of astronomical observatories

References

Further reading 
 Ray E. Boomhower, '"The Doctor and the Stars: Goethe Link and His Observatory," Traces of Indiana and Midwestern History, v. 19, no. 4, Fall 2007, pp. 17–23.
Frank K. Edmondson, "Recent Developments at the Goethe Link Observatory," Sky and Telescope, December 1948, p. 34.
 "Reports of Observatories, 1950-1951: Goethe Link Observatory, July 1, 1949 to June 30, 1951," The Astronomical Journal, v. 56, no. 6 (1951), p. 153, col. 2.

External links 
 Indiana Astrononical Society website
 WTIU Friday Zone Field Trip: A Look Through the Goethe-Link Observatory's Giant Telescope
 Image of the 10-inch lens telescope  manipulated by Professor Frank K. Edmondson of Indiana University at the Goethe Link Observatory (1950s)
 

1939 establishments in Indiana
Astronomical observatories in Indiana
Buildings and structures in Morgan County, Indiana

Indiana University
Minor-planet discovering observatories